The second season of Dynasty, an American television series based on the 1980s prime time soap opera of the same name, originally aired in the United States on The CW from October 12, 2018, through May 24, 2019. The season was produced by CBS Television Studios, with Sallie Patrick as showrunner and executive producer alongside executive producers Josh Schwartz and Stephanie Savage. Debuting on October 11, 2017, the series was renewed for a second season on April 2, 2018. Dynasty was renewed for a third season on January 31, 2019.

Season two stars Elizabeth Gillies as Fallon Carrington, Grant Show as her father Blake Carrington, and James Mackay as her brother Steven, with Robert Christopher Riley as Michael Culhane, Sam Adegoke as Jeff Colby, Rafael de la Fuente as Sam Jones, Alan Dale as Joseph Anders, and Nicollette Sheridan as Alexis Carrington. Series regulars added for the second season include Ana Brenda Contreras as Cristal Jennings, Maddison Brown as Kirby, and Sam Underwood as Adam Carrington, Blake and Alexis's eldest son. Notable recurring characters featured in season two include Monica Colby (Wakeema Hollis); Dominique Deveraux (Michael Michele); Claudia Blaisdel (Brianna Brown); Liam Ridley (Adam Huber); Ada Stone (Katherine LaNasa); Melissa Daniels (Kelly Rutherford); and Hank Sullivan (Brent Antonello).

Cast and characters

Main
 Elizabeth Gillies as Fallon Carrington, an Atlanta energy executive and heiress who is the daughter of billionaire Blake Carrington and his first wife, Alexis
 Marisa Hampton portrays a younger Fallon 
 Nicollette Sheridan (later Gillies)  as Alexis Carrington, Blake's ex-wife, mother of Adam, Steven, and Fallon
 Ana Brenda Contreras as Cristal Jennings, a friend of Blake's late wife, Cristal Flores
 James Mackay as Steven Carrington, Fallon's gay environmentalist brother, raised as Blake's son but fathered by Anders
 Rafael de la Fuente as Samuel Josiah "Sammy Jo" Jones, nephew of Blake's late wife Celia, and Steven's husband
 Robert Christopher Riley as Michael Culhane, Fallon's fiancé, formerly the Carrington chauffeur
 Sam Adegoke as Jeff Colby, business rival to Blake, revealed to be his nephew
 Maddison Brown as Kirby Anders, Joseph's daughter
 Alan Dale as Joseph Anders, the Carrington majordomo
 Grant Show as Blake Carrington, recently widowed billionaire, father of Fallon and Adam by his first wife, Alexis
 Sam Underwood as Adam Carrington / Dr. Mike Harrison, Blake's and Alexis's eldest son, who was kidnapped as an infant

Recurring

 Adam Huber as Liam Ridley, a writer who marries Fallon and whose real name is Jack Lowden
 Brent Antonello as Hank Sullivan, Alexis's former lover and co-conspirator in a plot to fleece Carrington Atlantic
 Wakeema Hollis as Monica Colby, Jeff's sister and Blake's niece
 Katherine LaNasa as Ada Stone, an antiquities dealer who blackmails Michael
 Brianna Brown as Claudia Blaisdel, the disturbed woman who killed Blake's wife Cristal/Celia
 Nicole Zyana as Allison, Fallon's assistant

Guests
 Kelly Rutherford as Melissa Daniels, wife of Senator Paul Daniels, and Steven's former lover
 C. Thomas Howell as Max Van Kirk, Liam's uncle
 Pawel Szajda as Nikolai Dimitrov, a Russian oligarch interested in buying Carrington Atlantic
 Shannon Lucio as Mora Van Kirk, Max's wife
 Sharon Lawrence as Laura Van Kirk, Liam's mother
 Brian Krause as George, Liam's stepfather
 Natalie Karp as Mrs. Gunnerson, the Carrington cook
 Robert Arbogast as Dr. Nick Toscanni
 Michael Masini as Keith Hayes, Ada's associate
 Harriet Sansom Harris as Adriana, a psychic
 Arnetia Walker as Louella Culhane, Michael's mother
 Elizabeth Youman as Evie Culhane, Michael's sister
 Yani Gellman as Manuel, a tattoo artist that Sam hires as a "manny" for baby Matthew / Little Blake
 Joanna Going as Mimi Rose Prescott, Alexis's socialite friend
 David Furr as Nico Russo, a Van Kirk employee who threatens to expose Michael's criminal activities
 Taylor Black as Ashley Cunningham, Liam's new girlfriend
 Maulik Pancholy as Kenneth Desai, a reporter doing a story on Fallon
 Nicole Steinwedell as Lady Monk, a self-help guru Sam finds online
 Bill Barrett and later Chase Anderson as Tony, the Carrington gardener
 Damon Dayoub as Mark Jennings, Cristal's ex-husband
 Mathilde Warnier as Juliette Carrington, the French daughter of Blake's disinherited brother Benjamin
 Geovanni Gopradi as Roberto "Beto" Flores, Cristal's brother
 Jeremy Davidson as Nathan "Mack" Macintosh, Blake's hired muscle
 Elizabeth Fendrick as Theresa Harrison, Mike / Adam's foster mother
 P. J. Byrne as Stuart, a publishing executive who crosses Fallon
 Chris Brochu as Dale, the ghost writer of Fallon's memoir
 Lamont Thompson as Dr. Glennon, the team doctor for the Atlantix
 Andrea Bordeaux as Gloria Collins, a popular feminist podcaster Fallon seeks to land for her new publishing company
 Tony Plana as Silvio Flores, Cristal's father
 Hakeem Kae-Kazim as Cesil Colby, Jeff and Monica's father
 Michael Michele as Dominique Deveraux, Jeff and Monica's mother, Blake's half-sister
 Jessi Goei as Trixie Tate, a childhood friend of Fallon's who was killed at Carrington Manor

Cast notes

Episodes

Production

Development
Dynasty was renewed for a 22-episode second season on April 2, 2018. A May 2018 press release teased that the show would introduce Blake's half-sister Dominique Deveraux, Jeff and Monica's mother, in season two. In March 2019, the role was cast with Michael Michele. In December 2018, AlloCiné reported that Dynasty would film an episode in Paris and its suburbs in January 2019 during Paris Fashion Week. Dynasty was renewed for a third season on January 31, 2019. In May 2019, Deadline Hollywood reported that co-executive producer Josh Reims would succeed Sallie Patrick as executive producer and showrunner for season three.

Casting

In May 2018, TVLine reported that Nicollette Sheridan would be a series regular for the second season. In June 2018, original cast member Nathalie Kelley, who portrayed Celia Machado  Cristal Flores Carrington, told E! News that she would not be returning for season two. The CW announced in August 2018 that Ana Brenda Contreras had been cast as "the real Cristal Flores" for the second season. Maddison Brown was also cast as Anders's daughter, Kirby, and Sharon Lawrence portrayed the guest role of Liam's mother, Laura Van Kirk. Grant Show's wife Katherine LaNasa joined the cast in October 2018 in the recurring role of Ada Stone.

In November 2018, The CW confirmed that James Mackay would no longer be a series regular after the first four episodes of season two, but would return later in the season. The CW announced on February 25, 2019 that Sheridan would be leaving Dynasty to focus on "some personal family responsibilities." Sheridan said in her own statement that she was leaving to spend more time with her terminally ill mother in Los Angeles. She last appeared in the episode "Motherly Overprotectiveness". Elizabeth Gillies, who was already playing Fallon on the show, took over the role after Sheridan's departure near the end of the second season. Her three-episode portrayal was a temporary recast to give producers time to find a suitable replacement for Sheridan. In March 2019, Sam Underwood began appearing as Blake and Alexis's kidnapped eldest child, Adam. The same month, it was announced that Michael Michele had been cast as Blake's half-sister Dominique. Michele first appeared in "New Lady in Town".

Broadcast
Season two of Dynasty premiered on October 12, 2018, and the season finale aired on May 24, 2019. The season became available on Netflix in the US on June 1, 2019.

Reception
On May 15, 2019, Dynasty ranked #5 on the list of most-watched series on Netflix in the UK, and #8 on the overall list of shows and films. The series ranked #6 the following week.

Ratings

Critical response
In a review of the first nine episodes, Hidden Remote critic Georgia Makitalo gave the second season a letter grade of a B, noting that it's "more for the bigger story that I believe the writers are setting up for viewers," and that the grade could drop to a D if the storylines do not improve soon. Praise was given to the stunning and campy scenes that "make the show worth watching," such as The Great Gatsby inspired party and the Wizard of Oz dream sequence. Criticism was geared toward the lack of direction since selling Carrington Atlantic, noting that "Fallon needs something to do," as well as the Colbys' lack of screentime.

Makitalo was also disappointed in Alexis's development in the second season, stating:

References

External links
 
 

2018 American television seasons
2019 American television seasons
Dynasty (2017 TV series) seasons